Nikolai Fedorovich Chuzhak (real surname Nasimovich, ; 20 August 1876, Nizhny Novgorod – 3 September 1937, St Petersburg) was a Russian Bolshevik journalist, literary critic and art theorist.

Chuzhak was a son of a craftsman who was attracted to the RSDLP in 1896. In 1904 he went to Geneva and became involved in the production of Proletarii. He returned to Russia and involved himself in revolutionary politics in St Petersburg, attending the RSDLP conference for military and combat organizations held in Tammerfors in 1906. However he was arrested shortly afterwards and in 1908 he was exiled to Irkutsk. Following the February Revolution of 1917 he joined the unified committee of the RSDLP in Irkutsk and started editing Rabochaia Sibir’. He remained in the Far East of Russia heading the Press department of the regional bureau of the RCP(B), editing Krasnoe znamia (Vladivostok), Dal’nevostochnyi put’ (Chita), and Vlast’ Truda in Irkutsk. He worked underground following Alexander Kolchak's accession to power.

He moved to Moscow in 1922 and joined LEF, helping to draft the group's founding documents. He was associated with Factography and the concept of "art as the creation of life". However he left in 1924 dissatisfied with what he regarded as Mayakovsky's traditional approach to poetry.

Nikolai Chuzhak was father of the chess composer Evgeny Nikolaevich Somov (1910–1944).

Texts
 Toward an Aesthetic of Marxism” (1912)
 Siberian Poets and Their Works (1916)
 The Siberian Theme in Poetry (1922)
 Under the Banner of Life-Building  (An Attempt to Understand  the Art of Today)'' (1923)

References

1876 births
1937 deaths
Journalists from the Russian Empire